Area code 985 is the telephone area code for southeastern Louisiana, excluding the inner ring of the New Orleans area. The area code was created in 2001 when it was split off from area code 504.

Area code 985 also used to include areas southeast of New Orleans. However, in 2007, these areas switched back to 504. These communities are on both sides of the Mississippi River in "lower" Plaquemines Parish, including Pointe à la Hache on the east bank, with Port Sulphur, Buras, and Boothville on the west bank.  The area's local switching facilities were almost destroyed due to flooding from Hurricane Katrina. Since the nearest switching facilities were in New Orleans, it was decided to put these downriver communities back in 504.  Permissive use of 504 alongside 985 to reach these areas once again began on July 29, 2007; mandatory use of 504 began on July 1, 2008.

Cities covered by area code 985
Abita Springs
Amite
Angie
Bayou L'Ourse
Berwick
Bogalusa
Bourg
Boutte
Covington
Destrehan
Edgard
Folsom
Franklinton
Galliano
 Gibson 
Golden Meadow
Grand Isle
Hammond
Houma
Independence
Kentwood
Lacombe
LaPlace
Lockport
Luling
Mandeville
Madisonville
Morgan City
Napoleonville
 Norco
Patterson
Pearl River
Ponchatoula
Raceland
Reserve
Robert
Slidell
Thibodaux
Tickfaw
Varnado

See also
List of Louisiana area codes

References
Area code history. AreaCode-Info.com.

External links

 List of exchanges from AreaCodeDownload.com, 985 Area Code

985
985